Auferstehung (German for Resurrection) is the third full-length album of the German musical project Janus.

Track listing
Disc 1:
"Wenn du vor mir stehst"–1:40
"Paulas Spiel"–5:15
"Ich will seinen Kopf"–4:49
"Scherbengesicht"–3:32
"Die Tage werden enger"–5:36
"Neunundachtzig"–4:00
"Überleben"–5:36
"Du siehst aus wie immer"–5:20
"Auferstehung"–9:53
"Paulas Traum"–5:35

Disc 2 (Kleine Ängste) (only in the limited edition):
"Kleine Ängste"-4:45
"Das Land unter dem Bett"-1:36
"Lemuren"-2:45
"Die Welt steht Kopf"-7:06
"Kinderaugen"-4:07
"Ein sicherer Ort"-2:59
"Die letzte Tür"-5:04

Info
 All tracks written and produced by Janus
 Vocals by Dirk Riegert
 Programming and piano by Tobias Hahn

External links
 Janus Discography Info

2004 albums
Janus (musical project) albums